Gaetano Letizia (born 29 June 1990) is an Italian professional footballer who plays as a right-back for  club Benevento.

Club career
Born in Naples, Letizia made his senior debut with Pianura in Serie D. In the summer of 2010 he joined Aversa Normanna.

On 27 July 2012, Letizia moved to Carpi in a co-ownership deal. On 24 August 2013 he made his Serie B debut, starting in a 0–1 defeat against Ternana; Letizia scored his first goal on 26 December, netting his side's second of a 3–1 win at Virtus Lanciano.

On 7 July 2017, he moved to newly promoted Benevento on a three year contract.

References

External links

1990 births
Footballers from Naples
Living people
Association football fullbacks
Italian footballers
Serie A players
Serie B players
Serie C players
A.C. Carpi players
S.F. Aversa Normanna players
Benevento Calcio players